Giorgio Dellagiovanna (10 July 1941 – 17 October 2013) was an Italian professional football player.

Honours
 Serie A champion: 1964/65, 1965/66.

References

External links
Giorgio Dellagiovanna at footballdatabase.eu

1941 births
2013 deaths
Italian footballers
Serie A players
Serie B players
Inter Milan players
Brescia Calcio players
S.S.D. Varese Calcio players
U.S. 1913 Seregno Calcio players
Potenza S.C. players
Association football defenders
A.C.D. Sant'Angelo 1907 players